is a shōjo manga  series by Tetsuya Chiba. It was serialized in Shōjo Friend, published by Kodansha, from April to September 1968. It was adapted into a monochrome 1968 Toei anime series with the same name directed by Fusahito Nagaki, Yasuo Yamaguchi, Yugo Serikawa and Takeshi Tamiya, which was originally broadcast on Fuji TV.

According to Jonathan Clements and Helen McCarthy's The Anime Encyclopedia, it was "deliberately designed to evoke a distant, carefree time of rural childhood for city kids deprived of the opportunity, placing it in the same spirit as My Neighbor Totoro." It has been debated that the anime is a more simplified version of the more in-depth themes of the manga.

Plot
A cute young girl, Akane formerly lived in the countryside with her grandfather, but decides to return home to Tokyo and go to a prestigious school. However, coming from the country has its downfalls and Akane soon realizes that she doesn't fit in with the snobby rich kids at school. Nonetheless, she finds a friend in a delinquent kid named Hidemaro. He is consistently the victim of bullying and Akane begins to stand up for him. At school, the pair find a dog which they ironically name Chibi despite its great stature. Akane, Hidemaro, and Chibi begin their zany, comedic misadventures.

Opening Theme:

"Akane-chan Song" by Minori Matsushima

Ending Theme:

"Hidebaro Song" by Kazue Takahashi

Characters
 Akane Kamijo (Voiced by: Minori Matsushima)
 Hidemaro Kitajoji (Voiced by: Kazue Takahashi)
 Sakura Kamijo (Voiced by: Kazuko Sugiyama)
 Mrs. Kamijo (Voiced by: Haruko Yajima)
 Mr. Kamijo (Voiced by: Toshiya Ogata)

References

External links
 

1968 manga
1968 anime television series debuts
Japanese children's animated comedy television series
Fuji TV original programming
Kodansha manga
Shōjo manga
Toei Animation television